"Subway Wars" is the fourth episode of the sixth season of the CBS sitcom How I Met Your Mother, and the 116th episode overall. "Subway Wars" was nominated for Outstanding Directing for a Comedy Series at the 63rd Primetime Emmy Awards. It originally aired on October 11, 2010.

Plot 

While the gang hangs out at MacLaren's and after Barney disgusts the group with his plan to seduce a heartbroken woman, Marshall learns that his friend Max from law school has just spotted Woody Allen at a restaurant downtown. While Robin is interested in seeing him, the rest of the gang are not as they have seen him plenty of times. As they tease Robin about not being a "real" New Yorker, as she is from Canada, she tries to impress them by saying she has seen Maury Povich, but the gang is again unimpressed, as they have all seen him many times as well. The group debates what it takes to become a real New Yorker; Ted states it is stealing a cab from someone who really needs one, Lily argues it is crying on the subway and not caring what others think, while Marshall states it is killing a cockroach with one's bare hands. Robin admits that she has not done any of those things, but Future Ted states that by the end of the day, she would have done all three.

The group then debate on the fastest way to get to the restaurant, and quickly decide to race each other there: Ted rides the bus, Lily takes the subway, Robin opts to hail a cab, Marshall decides to run there on foot, and Barney claims to have the fastest method of all while even enjoying a steak first at a nearby restaurant: he fakes a heart attack after eating the steak, then uses the ambulance ride to a hospital right next to the downtown restaurant as his quick transportation. His plan backfires, however, when the ambulance takes him to a hospital uptown, and he is forced to contact Ranjit for a ride. Meanwhile, Lily misinterprets the subway conductor's announcement that the subway is undergoing maintenance, and soon after exiting the train, it departs. Marshall is at first enthusiastic and confident that he can outrun everyone, though he soon begins to lose energy while on foot. Ted, having been stunned after receiving a negative review on a teacher rating website despite having received many positive ones, attempts to impress others riding with his knowledge of New York architecture, though he mainly bores and annoys them.

Robin hails a cab, stealing it from a woman carrying bags who then angrily leaps on top of the windshield. Robin and the cab driver are freaked out, so Robin abandons the ride, and later rides along with Barney in Ranjit's car. During the ride, Robin angrily reveals to Barney that she had tried to talk to him about how low she was feeling recently due to her break-up with Don and feeling shunned and forgotten due to her overly-enthusiastic new co-anchor, yet Barney ignored her and tried to use her as a decoy while he eyed up a woman at the bar. Barney apologises to Robin, but she is not interested and leaves the car.

Halfway through the race, the group all coincidentally meet up, and though Ted proposes they declare a tie, they immediately continue the race. Robin takes the subway, where she sees a poster up for her news show, with her co-anchor's face taking up much more space then hers. Enraged, Robin rips it down, only to see an older poster behind it with one of her and Don. Robin breaks down crying, snapping at the other passengers when they look in her direction. Lily spots her and comforts her, though she quickly abandons her and calls Ranjit in favor of the race. Barney rides a pedicab, though he quickly changes places with the driver to bike there himself. Lily has Ranjit pick up Marshall on the way, and the two discuss their concerns: Lily had been feeling dejected after having been unable to conceive a baby with Marshall for two months, and Marshall was feeling the same, believing it to be his fault. They then agree there is really no rush to become parents, and promptly decide to head to Coney Island to have fun.

Ted, Barney, and Robin race for the finish; however, Barney trips, taking Ted down with him and allowing Robin to win the race. Future Ted tells his kids that, while Barney constantly denied it, he knew that Barney had spotted that Robin had been crying earlier, and purposefully tripped Ted and himself so Robin could win. Robin enjoys a meal with Max while Ted thanks Barney for letting Robin win. Max points out Woody Allen to Robin, who in fact turns out to be Maury Povich (who was also spotted during each of the group's individual journeys multiple times), although Future Ted states that Robin did see the real Woody Allen a couple of months later. Robin then kills a cockroach on the table with her hand, thus fulfilling all three tasks to become a real New Yorker.

Critical response 

Donna Bowman of The A.V. Club gave the episode a B+ rating.

Robert Canning of IGN gave the episode a rating of 9 out of 10.

DeAnn Welker of Television Without Pity gave the episode a B+ score.

Chris O'Hara of TVFanatic.com gave the episode a rating of 4 out of 5.

References

External links
 

How I Met Your Mother (season 6) episodes
2010 American television episodes